Quemado is a census-designated place in Catron County, New Mexico, United States. As of the 2010 census it had a population of 228. Walter De Maria's 1977 art installation,  The Lightning Field, is between Quemado and Pie Town, New Mexico.

Jerry D. Thompson, historian of the American Southwest, was reared in Quemado.

Geography

Climate 
Quemado (means "burnt" in English) was named by Spanish conquistadors due to the blackened stones that cover the earth.  It was caused by a fire that preceded the arrival of the Spanish in the early 1500s and the carbon remains partially due to paltry rainfall in the region. 

Quemado is categorized as being within the 6a USDA hardiness zone, meaning temperatures can get as low as -10 to -5 °F.

Demographics

Education
The school district is Quemado Schools.

See also

 List of census-designated places in New Mexico

References

Further reading

 (1989) "Nobody's a Stranger in Quemado," New Mexico Magazine 67:3, March.

External links

Census-designated places in Catron County, New Mexico
Census-designated places in New Mexico